Monastery of St. Nicodemus may refer to:

 Monastery of St. Nicodemus (Jerusalem)
 St. Nicodemus and St. Joseph of Arimathea Church, Ramla
 Monastery of Saint Nicodemus on Mount Athos

See also 
 Chapel of St. Nicodemus in the Church of the Holy Sepulchre